Cristian Ignacio Herrera López (born 13 March 1991) is a Spanish professional footballer who plays as a striker for UD Ibiza.

Club career
Born in Las Palmas, Canary Islands, Herrera was a product of hometown club UD Las Palmas' youth system. He made senior debut with the reserves in the 2010–11 season, spending several years with the side in the lower leagues. 

On 9 July 2013, Herrera rejected a new deal and joined Elche CF Ilicitano in the Segunda División B. On 24 November he made his first-team – and La Liga – debut, playing the last 12 minutes and scoring the winner in a 2–1 home win over neighbouring Valencia CF. On 18 June of the following year, after appearing in 21 matches and netting three goals during the campaign, he renewed his link until 2019 and was definitely promoted to the main squad.

Herrera terminated his contract with the Valencians on 7 August 2015, and signed a one-year deal with UD Almería nine days later. On 1 February 2016, however, he severed his ties and moved to Girona FC also from Segunda División hours later.

On 14 July 2017, Herrera cut ties with the Catalans and agreed to a two-year contract at CD Lugo the same day. On 13 August 2021, he signed a two-year deal with second-division newcomers UD Ibiza.

References

External links

1991 births
Living people
Spanish footballers
Footballers from Las Palmas
Association football forwards
La Liga players
Segunda División players
Segunda División B players
Tercera División players
UD Las Palmas Atlético players
Elche CF Ilicitano footballers
Elche CF players
UD Almería players
Girona FC players
CD Lugo players
UD Ibiza players